Charles Revet (9 November 1937 – 30 November 2021) was a French politician who was a member of the Senate of France, representing the Seine-Maritime department. He was a member of the Union for a Popular Movement.

References
 Page on the Senate website

1937 births
2021 deaths
The Republicans (France) politicians
Union for a Popular Movement politicians
French Senators of the Fifth Republic
Senators of Seine-Maritime